The Type 69 is a Chinese main battle tank.

Type 69 may also refer to:

 Type 69 RPG, Sino-Soviet rocket-propelled grenade
 Peugeot Type 69, alternate name for the Peugeot Bébé

See also
 Class 69 (disambiguation)